Jambuvanodai is a village in Thiruthiraipoondi taluk, Thiruvarur district, Tamil Nadu, India, near Muthupet. It is part of Muthupet Town

There is a lagoon nearby. 

Villages in Tiruvarur district